El Limonar International School (ELIS) refers to a pair of international schools in Spain, operated by the Cognita Group:

 El Limonar International School, Murcia 
 El Limonar International School, Villamartin